The following are the national records in track cycling in Hungary maintained by the Hungarian Cycling Federation.

Men

Women

References

External links
 Hungarian Cycling Federation official website

Hungary
Records
Track cycling
track cycling